Margaroniini is a tribe of the species-rich subfamily Spilomelinae in the pyraloid moth family Crambidae. The tribe was erected by Charles Swinhoe and Everard Charles Cotes in 1889, originally as family Margaronidae.

The tribe comprises a number of economically impactful species whose caterpillars feed on agricultural crops. These species include the legume pod borer (Maruca vitrata), the jasmine moth (Palpita vitrealis) on olives, the cucumber moth (Diaphania indica), species of the genus Conogethes such as the yellow peach moth (C. punctiferalis), and the coconut leafroller (Omiodes blackburni). Furthermore, the box tree moth (Cydalima perspectalis) is included in this tribe.

Genera

The tribe is by far the most species-rich among Spilomelinae. It currently comprises 1107 species in the following 74 genera:
Agathodes Guenée, 1854 (= Stenurges Lederer, 1863)
Agrioglypta Meyrick, 1932
Alytana J. C. Shaffer & Munroe, 2007
Analyta Lederer, 1863 (= Hyperanalyta Strand, 1918, misspelling Alyta Mabille, 1879)
Anarmodia Lederer, 1863 (= Asparagmia Amsel, 1956, Atheropoda Lederer, 1863, misspelling Aetheropoda Amsel, 1956)
Antigastra Lederer, 1863
Aphytoceros Meyrick, 1884
Arthroschista Hampson, 1893
Asturodes Amsel, 1956
Azochis Walker, 1859 (= Catacteniza Möschler, 1890, misspelling Arochis Walker, 1859)
Botyodes Guenée, 1854
Cadarena Moore, 1886 (= Idalia Hübner, 1825)
Caldubotys Singh, Kirti & Singh in Singh, Kirti, Singh & Ranjan, 2019
Caprinia Walker, 1859 (= misspelling Caprina Lederer, 1863)
Chabulina J. C. Shaffer & Munroe, 2007
Charitoprepes Warren, 1896
Chrysophyllis Meyrick, 1934
Chrysothyridia Munroe, 1967
Cirrhochrista Lederer, 1863 (= Ancalidia de Joannis, 1932, Eucallaenia Snellen, 1892, Margaronia Marumo, 1917, Pachybotys Warren, 1895, misspelling Cirrochrista Warren, 1892)
Colomychus Munroe, 1956
Compacta Amsel, 1956
Condylorrhiza Lederer, 1863
Conogethes Meyrick, 1884 (= Dadessa Moore, 1886, misspelling Conygethes Snellen, 1890)
Cydalima Lederer, 1863 (= Neoglyphodes Streltzov, 2008, Sisyrophora Lederer, 1863, Uliocome C. Swinhoe, 1900)
Diaphania Hübner, 1818 (= Diaphania Stephens, 1829, Eudioptis Hübner, 1823, Phakellura Guilding, 1830, misspelling Phacellura J. L. R. Agassiz, 1847, Sestia Snellen, 1875)
Didymostoma Warren, 1892
Dysallacta Lederer, 1863 (= misspelling Disallacta Lederer, 1863)
Endocrossis Meyrick, 1889
Eusabena Snellen, 1901
Filodes Guenée, 1854 (= Auxomitia Lederer, 1863)
Ghesquierellana Berger, 1955 (= Phalanta Ghesquière, 1942, misspelling Ghesquieriellana Munroe, 1959)
Glauconoe Warren, 1892
Glyphodella J. C. Shaffer & Munroe, 2007
Glyphodes Guenée, 1854 (= Caloptychia Hübner, 1825, misspelling Calliptychia J. L. R. Agassiz, 1847, Dysallacta Lederer, 1863, misspelling Disallacta Lederer, 1863, Morocosma Lederer, 1863)
Hedyleptopsis Munroe, 1960
Heterocnephes Lederer, 1863
Hodebertia Leraut, 2003
Hoterodes Guenée, 1854
Leucochroma Guenée, 1854
Liopasia Möschler, 1882 (= Dichotis Warren, 1892, Terastiodes Warren, 1892)
Loxmaionia Schaus, 1913
Maruca Walker, 1859 (= Siriocauta Lederer, 1863, misspelling Maruea Walker, 1859)
Marwitzia Gaede, 1917
Megaphysa Guenée, 1854
Megastes Guenée, 1854
Meroctena Lederer, 1863
Nevrina Guenée, 1854 (= misspelling Neurina Moore, 1885)
Nolckenia Snellen, 1875
Obtusipalpis Hampson, 1896
Omiodes Guenée, 1854 (= Charema Moore, 1888, Coenostola Lederer, 1863, misspelling Coenolesta Whalley, 1962, Deba Walker, 1866, Hedylepta Lederer, 1863, misspelling Hedilepta Lederer, 1863, misspelling Heydelepta Dyar, 1917, Lonchodes Guenée, 1854, Loxocreon Warren, 1892, Merotoma Meyrick, 1894, Pelecyntis Meyrick, 1884, Phycidicera Snellen, 1880, Spargeta Lederer, 1863)
Omphisa Moore, 1886
Pachynoa Lederer, 1863 (= Hypermeces Turner, 1933, Pitacanda Moore, 1886)
Palpita Hübner, 1808 (= Apyrausta Amsel, 1951, Conchia Hübner, 1821, Hapalia Hübner, 1818, Hvidodes C. Swinhoe, 1900, Margarodes Guenée, 1854, Ledereria Marschall, 1875, Margaronia Hübner, 1825, Paradosis Zeller, 1852, Sarothronota Lederer, 1863, Sebunta Walker, 1863, Sylora C. Swinhoe, 1900, Tobata Walker, 1859)
Parotis Hübner, 1831 (= Cenocnemis Warren, 1896, Chloauges Lederer, 1863, Enchocnemidia Lederer, 1863, Pachyarches Lederer, 1863)
Poliobotys J. C. Shaffer & Munroe, 2007
Polygrammodes Guenée, 1854 (= Astura Guenée, 1854, Dichocrocopsis Dyar, 1910, misspelling Dichocropsis Munroe, 1983, Hilaopsis Lederer, 1863)
Polygrammopsis Munroe, 1960
Polythlipta Lederer, 1863
Prenesta Snellen, 1875 (= misspelling Praenesta Hampson, 1899)
Pygospila Guenée, 1854 (= Lomotropa Lederer, 1863, Telespasta C. Swinhoe, 1906, misspelling Pygosspila Lederer, 1863)
Radessa Munroe, 1977
Rhagoba Moore, 1888
Rhimphalea Lederer, 1863
Sinomphisa Munroe, 1958
Sparagmia Guenée, 1854
Stemorrhages Lederer, 1863 (= misspelling Stemmorhages)
Synclera Lederer, 1863 (= misspellings Sinclera Swinhoe & Cotes, 1889, Synctera Möschler, 1886)
Syngamilyta Strand, 1920
Talanga Moore, 1885
Terastia Guenée, 1854 (= misspelling Tersatia Lederer, 1863)
Tessema J. F. G. Clarke, 1986
Tyspanodes Warren, 1891 (= misspelling Thyspanodes Caradja, 1925
Uncobotyodes Kirti & Rose, 1990
Zebronia Hübner, 1821

References

Spilomelinae
Moth tribes